David Le Bailly is a French journalist born in Paris.

Biography 
After working in the economic press (L'AGEFI, La Tribune), David Le Bailly joined the editorial staff at Paris Match in 2002. Specializing in investigations, he worked on the Bettencourt, Karachi and  affairs. He also conducted interviews with Roberto Saviano, Mohamed El Baradei, Julian Assange, Boris Berezovsky or Marina Silva. In 2014, he published his first book, La captive de Mitterrand, a novel-investigation on Anne Pingeot, François Mitterrand's shadow companion for more than thirty years. In 2014, he left Paris Match to join the editorial staff of L'Obs. He published several investigations, but also reports on France after the 2015 attacks.

Publications 
2014:

References 

20th-century French journalists
21st-century French journalists
Roger Nimier Prize winners
Journalists from Paris
Living people
Year of birth missing (living people)